The Ambassador Chicago, known for many decades as the Ambassador East, is a historic hotel in Chicago, established in 1926. In their heyday, both the hotel and its iconic restaurant, The Pump Room, were frequented by celebrities.

Location
The hotel is located at 1301 North State Parkway in the Gold Coast area of Chicago. It is located near the city's Magnificent Mile district. It is near Lake Michigan, which it has views of.

History
The Ambassador East opened in 1926.

The hotel received many celebrities in its heyday. Among the who held long-term residence in the hotel were Doris Day, Helen Hayes, Eunice Kennedy, and Lana Turner.

The hotel was featured in the film North by Northwest.

Dunfey Hotels acquired the hotel in 1978 and it was renamed the Ambassador East - A Dunfey Classic Hotel. In 1983, Dunfey Hotels became Omni Hotels, and the hotel became the Omni Ambassador East. Omni renovated the hotel in 1999, at a cost of $20 million. Omni sold the hotel in December 2005 to a joint venture of the Fordham Company, The Harp Group, and Mid-America Development Partners, for $47 million and the hotel returned to its original name. The new owners announced plans to convert the hotel to condominiums, but this never happened. 

In April 2010, Ian Schrager purchased the 285-room hotel for $25 million. This sale came during a down market. Schranger renovated the hotel, and reopened it as the PUBLIC Chicago in 2011. Schrager intended for the hotel to be the first in a chain of PUBLIC hotels.

The hotel was sold in 2017 to Shapack Partners and Gaw Capital for $61.5 million, which was considered an underwhelming sale price for the booming hotel market Chicago was experiencing at the time. They hired Journal Hotels to run the hotel as their first Chicago property. The hotel was renamed Ambassador Chicago.

In March 2020, it was announced that the hotel would join Hyatt's "Joie de Vivre Hotels" brand, and that a renovation was planned, with upgrades to the hotel’s 285 rooms and suites, as well as to public spaces, such as its "The Library" lounge.

Pump Room

From 1938 through 2017, the hotel was home to The Pump Room, a famed restaurant which was once heavily-frequented by celebrities. The interior was originally designed by the Samuel Abraham Marx. The restaurant's heyday was in the 1950s and 1960s.

After the 2017 closure of The Pump Room, Lettuce Entertain You Enterprises opened a new restaurant in the space named "Booth One". This restaurant closed in 2019, with the exit of Lettuce Entertain You Enterprises. The hotel is now home to a restaurant named "The Food Gallery".

Ambassador West (former sister hotel)
The hotel had a sister hotel, the Ambassador West, across the street. In 2002, after 80 years of operation, this hotel was liquidated and turned into a condominiums.

In 1958, the hotel built a new $1 million ballroom named the "Guildhall" on vacant neighboring land it had acquired. The interior was designed by Samuel Abraham Marx. A pair of two extravagant parties were held to christen the new event space. The first party was attended by celebrities such as Douglas Fairbanks Jr., and featured entertainment from Carol Channing.

During their 1959 visit to Chicago, Elizabeth II and Prince Philip, Duke of Edinburgh dined at the hotel at a luncheon hosted by Governor William Stratton. This was Elizabeth II's only visit to the city of Chicago.

Like the Ambassador East, the hotel was featured in the film North by Northwest, with its marble front desk used in a scene in which Cary Grant's character is questioned by a clerk.

Notes

Hotel buildings completed in 1926
1926 establishments in Illinois
Hotels established in 1926
Hotels in Chicago